This article lists important figures and events in Malaysian public affairs during the year 1975, together with births and deaths of notable Malaysians.

Incumbent political figures

Federal level
Yang di-Pertuan Agong: 
Sultan Abdul Halim Muadzam Shah (until 21 September)
Sultan Yahya Petra (from 21 September)
Raja Permaisuri Agong: 
Sultanah Bahiyah (until 21 September)
Raja Perempuan Zainab (from 21 September)
Prime Minister: Tun Abdul Razak
Deputy Prime Minister: Dato' Hussein Onn
Lord President: Mohamed Suffian Mohamed Hashim

State level
 Sultan of Johor: Sultan Ismail
 Sultan of Kedah: Tengku Abdul Malik (Regent until 21 September)
 Sultan of Kelantan: Tengku Ismail Petra (Regent from 21 September)
 Raja of Perlis: Tuanku Syed Putra
 Sultan of Perak: Sultan Idris Shah II
 Sultan of Pahang: Sultan Ahmad Shah (Deputy Yang di-Pertuan Agong)
 Sultan of Selangor: Sultan Salahuddin Abdul Aziz Shah
 Sultan of Terengganu: Sultan Ismail Nasiruddin Shah
 Yang di-Pertuan Besar of Negeri Sembilan: Tuanku Jaafar
 Yang di-Pertua Negeri (Governor) of Penang:
Tun Syed Sheikh Barabakh (until April)
Tun Sardon Jubir (from April)
 Yang di-Pertua Negeri (Governor) of Malacca:
Tun Haji Abdul Aziz bin Abdul Majid (until May)
Tun Syed Zahiruddin bin Syed Hassan (from May)
 Yang di-Pertua Negeri (Governor) of Sarawak: Tun Tuanku Bujang Tuanku Othman
 Yang di-Pertua Negeri (Governor) of Sabah:
Tun Fuad Stephens (until June)
Tun Mohd Hamdan Abdullah (from June)

Events
18 February – Communist terrorists sabotaged the railway track which derailed the goods train at Rimba Mas near Padang Besar, Perlis.
1–15 March – The 3rd Hockey World Cup was held in Kuala Lumpur.
31 March – Communist terrorists staged a mortar attack on the Royal Malaysian Air Force base in Sempang Airport, Kuala Lumpur, damaging a Caribou light transport aircraft.
1 May – The 25th anniversary of Malaysian Trade Union Congress was celebrated.
17 May – Special Branch officer, Leong Ming Kong was assassinated by communist rebels in Langkap, Perak.
20 May – Communist terrorists killed police detective, Ong Teng Chin in Ipoh, Perak.
June – The piling works for the Kompleks Tun Abdul Razak (KOMTAR) in Penang were completed.
19 June – Eight members of the security forces and three civilians were killed in an ambush by Communist terrorists in Kubang Pasu, Kedah.
30 June – World Heavyweight Champion, Muhammad Ali arrived in Malaysia for the boxing match against Joe Bugner.
1 July – World Heavyweight Champion, Muhammad Ali defeated Joe Bugner in a 15-round boxing match at Merdeka Stadium, Kuala Lumpur.
5 August – The AIA building hostage crisis occurred at AIA building in Kuala Lumpur, led by 5 members of the Japanese Red Army.
15 August – Communist terrorist fired rockets at the State Security Council's Military representative's house in Ipoh, Perak. 
25 August – The International Women's Year was commemorated.
27 August – The Tugu Negara (National Monument) was bombed by communist terrorists.
3 September – Communist terrorists threw four hand grenades at the Police Field Force (PFF) Brigade headquarters at Jalan Pekeliling, Kuala Lumpur, killing two and injuring 51 PFF personnel.
21 September – Sultan Yahya Petra of Kelantan was elected as the sixth Yang di-Pertuan Agong.
22 September – The International Quran Recital Competition was held in Kuala Lumpur.
22 October – The 50th anniversary of the Rubber Research Institute of Malaysia was celebrated.
13 November – Tan Sri Khoo Chong Kong, a Perak state police chief was assassinated by the communist rebels in Ipoh, Perak.

Births
6 May – Janet Khoo – Malaysian Chinese teen actress
23 June – Lee Kiat Lee, politician
28 June – Ning Baizura – Singer
23 October – Roslin Hashim – Badminton player
24 November – Lee Wan Wah – Badminton player (doubles)
Unknown date – Abdul Malik Mydin – Solo swimmer

Deaths
8 October – Tun Syed Sheikh Barabakh – Penang state governor (Yang di-Pertua Negeri)
13 November – Tan Sri Khoo Chong Kong – Perak state police chief

References

See also
 1975 
 1974 in Malaysia | 1976 in Malaysia
 History of Malaysia

 
Years of the 20th century in Malaysia
Malaysia
Malaysia
1970s in Malaysia